Victor Alexander Mateo Nadera (born July 27, 1989) is a Dominican professional baseball pitcher who is currently a free agent.

Career
He was born in the Dominican Republic city of Santo Domingo. He was signed by the Tampa Bay Devil Rays as a non-drafted free agent on November 15, 2006. Starting his professional career the next year, the 17-year-old went 0-2 with a 6.39 ERA in 38 innings for the DSL Devil Rays his first campaign. The next year, back with the Dominican Summer League club, he went 3-4 with a 4.07 ERA in 48.2 innings. With the GCL Rays in 2010, Mateo was 3-4 with a 1.98 ERA in 10 games (nine starts), walking only nine batters in 50 innings. He tied for the team lead in victories and led the  squad in games started. In 2010, Mateo was 2-5 with a 4.89 ERA in 15 games (five starts) for the Princeton Rays.

2011 was Mateo's first 10-win campaign, as he went 12-6 with a 3.98 ERA in 26 games (20 starts) for the Bowling Green Hot Rods. During the week of July 11, he earned Pitcher of the Week honors as he tossed a no hitter against the Lake County Captains on July 8. He was one of only two players on the team to toss a complete game shutout, with the other being C.J. Riefenhauser. He pitched for the Charlotte Stone Crabs in 2012 and went 6-5 with a 4.31 ERA in 30 games (16 starts). With the Montgomery Biscuits in 2013, Mateo was 7-9 with a 3.93 ERA in 27 games. He tossed two complete game shutouts, including another no hitter—this time against the Jacksonville Suns on August 24. He was the only pitcher on the team to toss a complete game. He also led the team in innings pitched (153.1) and team starters in WHIP (1.141). He was the only pitcher in the Southern League to throw two shutouts. During the 2013-2014 winter league season, he pitched briefly for the Tigres de Aragua of the Venezuelan Winter League and Estrellas de Oriente of the Dominican Winter League. In 2014, he went 12-11 with a 3.90 ERA in 28 starts for the Biscuits, completing two games. He led the team in wins and tied Dylan Floro for the club lead in starts. He also tied Floro, Drew Gagnon and Justin Nicolino for the Southern League lead in starts. He made the Southern League Mid-Season All-Star team that year.

Following the 2014 campaign, Mateo became a free agent and signed with the Atlanta Braves. He began the season with the Double-A Mississippi Braves, but was promoted to the Triple-A Gwinnett Braves partway through the season.

He earned invitations to work with the major league club during spring training in 2012, 2014 and 2015.

On December 2015, he was selected to the roster for the Dominican Republic national baseball team at the 2015 WBSC Premier12.

References

External links

1989 births
Living people
Baseball pitchers
Bowling Green Hot Rods players
Cangrejeros de Santurce (baseball) players
Dominican Republic expatriate baseball players in Puerto Rico
Charlotte Stone Crabs players
Dominican Republic expatriate baseball players in the United States
Dominican Republic national baseball team players
Dominican Summer League Devil Rays players
Dominican Summer League Rays players
Estrellas Orientales players
Gulf Coast Rays players
Gwinnett Braves players

Leones del Escogido players
Liga de Béisbol Profesional Roberto Clemente pitchers
Mississippi Braves players
Montgomery Biscuits players
Princeton Rays players
Sportspeople from Santo Domingo
Tigres de Aragua players
York Revolution players
2015 WBSC Premier12 players
Dominican Republic expatriate baseball players in Venezuela